Kroc is a surname. Notable people with the name include:

 Janae Kroc (born 1972), bodybuilder and powerlifter
 Joan Kroc (1929–2003), American philanthropist
 Ray Kroc (1902–1984), American founder of McDonald's

See also
People with the surname Krock
People with the surname Krok